Percy Charles George Damman (7 May 1876 – 28 February 1970) was an Australian rules footballer who played with St Kilda in the Victorian Football League (VFL).

References

External links 

1876 births
1970 deaths
Australian rules footballers from Victoria (Australia)
St Kilda Football Club players
People educated at Melbourne Grammar School